Kim Joo-yeon (born May 11, 1993) is a South Korean musical, stage and television actress. She is best known for her role in Netflix Original Series Move to Heaven (2021) and Hometown Cha-Cha-Cha (2021).

Early years 
Kim Joo-yeon was born on May 11, 1993, in Jeju, South Korea as the youngest of three daughters. Brought up in Jeju, Kim was too far from theater or musical exposure. Her path changed after she met art teacher Ko Seong-woo in the 3rd grade of her elementary school. Kim had the male role in her school team for the national folk song competition and her team won the grand prize. The experience gradually changed her shy girl personality.

Being a fan of indie band Jaurim, Kim became interested in music and took singing lessons from a teacher who was a former professor of Seoul Institute of The Arts. Through the teacher recommendation, she was enrolled at Anyang Arts High School. She then joined the school musical club and her first experience in acting was in school musical Beauty and The Beast. After finishing high school, Kim moved to Seoul and enrolled in the Department of Theater and Film at Dongguk University.

Career

Debut 
Kim’s career beginnings can be credited to her student-mentor relationship with producer Kim Soo-ro, who was her professor at Dongguk University. In the fall of 2015, Kim debuted as a theater actress with the role of Hwa-yi, the female lead in the play Taxi Driver by playwright Jang Jin. The 12th production of play 'Taxi Driver' in 2015 was a collaboration between Jang Jin and producer Kim Soo-ro as part of Kim Soo-ro’s Project. Kim then joined agency Double K Film and Theater, founded by  Kim Soo-ro and Kim Min-jong.

In 2016, Kim made her debut as a musical actress in the musical Interview, She was double cast as Joan, an 18-year-old girl who suffered a mysterious accident, alongside the more senior actress Moon Jin-ah. Produced by Kim Soo-ro, who served as curator of Hyundai Card Understage, this was a musical thriller that uncovered a murder case from a decade ago, and the story switched between the past and the present through interviews. In the same year, she joined the cast of the musical Peste, a Korean creative musical based on The Plague (La Peste), a novel by Albert Camus. Played at the LG Arts Center from August to October 2016, Kim did the role of Jan by herself. The musical was famous because it was composed by Seo Taiji and arranged by Kim Seong-su.

Throughout 2017, Kim remained busy as an actress. Kim reprised her role as Joan for an encore expedition performance of the musical Interview in Tokyo, Japan. Theater audiences started to notice Kim through the role of Natasha in the Korean adaptation of the classic play The Lower Depths by Russian dramatist Maxim Gorky. Kim gave a surprising twist and best tension. Her beauty made her nicknamed 'Daehak-ro Kim Tae-hee'. From June to October 2017, Kim performed the supporting role of Seon in an encore performance of musical The Great Catsby. It was adapted from Kang Do-ha‘s webtoon of the same name by dramaturge Oh Se-hyuk, director Byun Jeong-ju, music director Huh Su-hyun, and choreographer Kwon Young-im.

Kim got her big break in 2018, when she starred in the 20th production of musical Laundry, playing the role of Son Na-young. Premiered in 2005, this musical depicts the hardships of ordinary people, centered on bookstore clerk Son Na-young and Solongo, a Mongolian migrant worker. In May, she joined the principal casts of the musical Maybe Happy Ending as helperbot Claire for a 2018 encore performance in Japan. She was double cast alongside actress Song Sang-eun from the Japanese premiere and also starred opposite Yesung, Seven, and Seong-je who were triple cast as helperbot Oliver. Also, Kim Nam-ho and Ra-jun were double cast as Oliver's former owner, James. It was performed in May in Yokohama and Osaka. Her last work for the year was Emily in Disappear Into Thin Air (2018), the Korean adaptation of Disappearance, a play by Keralino Sandorovich, a Japanese playwright and director, produced by Yeonwoo Stage.

Temple and other theater projects 
In early 2019, Kim played Mary Warren in the Korean adaptation of American playwright Arthur Miller's play The Crucible (1953) at the Lee Haerang Theatre of Art Seoul. The play was produced by her agency, Double K Film and Theater. Kim was double-cast as Chae Kyung with Hong Ji-hee in Hot Summer (2019) by Theater Ganda. It was performed at the Yes24 Stage 3 Hall from May 17 to June 30, 2019.

Kim played the title character in the period musical Create-ing 2nd work: Nangrang Kisaeng produced by Jeongdong Theater. It was inspired by the true story of Kang Hyang-ran (姜香蘭), the first short-haired kisaeng in Joseon. At the age of 14, Kang enrolled at the Hannam Kwonbeon. Later, due to her outstanding skills, she became one of the most popular kisaeng at the time. Kang decided to cut her hair short and dress like a man in a suit to be able to enter school, but her disguise was unfortunately blown shortly after. The incident became a huge scandal and on June 22, 1922, an article was published on the third page of the Dong-A Ilbo. Directed by director Kang Yu-mi, the musical was held at the Jeongdong Theater from July 26 to August 18, 2019.

Kim's most critically acclaimed role of the year was that of Temple Grandin in the Theater Ganda's physical play Temple. The plot was based on the true story of a professor at Colorado State University, Temple Grandin, who became a world-class zoologist despite being autistic. Kim, who was double cast as Temple with actress Park Hee-jung, appeared in this work the recommendation of assistant director Shim Sae-in, whom she met while working in the play Hot Summer. To prepare for this role, Kim did extensive research, including reading The Story of a Certain Autistic Man written by Temple Grandin several times. She also referenced the acting of Cho Seung-woo in the movie Marathon and Kim Hyang-gi in Innocent Witness.

It was premiered at the Goyang Cultural Foundation in 2019. It had an encore performance through festival Welcome Daehakro—Welcome Theater in 2020, and another Daehakro encore performance in 2021. Kim, who had appeared in Temple since the premiere, was praised as "Temple herself" for her excellent acting. Kim also drew evaluations that she had advanced as an actor through a dramatic change in acting that was so different from her previous works such as the musicals Julie and Paul and Damian.

Kim returned to Theater Ganda productions with the role Ann in Korean premiere of the musical Murderer (2019). The work was based on Georg Kaiser's play The Raft of Medusa. It was performed from September 20 to November 17 at Daehangno TOM 2.

The year 2020 was a busy year for Kim Joo-yeon. From January to March, Kim and Lee Ji-soo appeared as the eccentric wacky weaver who swallowed a magnet, Julie, in composer Kim Dae-ri's notable musical Julie & Paul (2020). The musical Julie & Paul was produced by Yeonwoo Stage. From March to April, Kim played dual roles Demian and Sinclair in the musical Demian (2020). The musical was based on the novel Demian by Hermann Hesse. The work is a unique two-person musical play in which two actors take turns taking on roles without a fixed role, a gender blind casting concept in which one male and one female actor plays Sinclair or Demian. Demian also plays other characters in the novel, including Cromer, Sinclair's father, Pistorius, and Mrs. Eva. From June to September, Kim and Lee Ah-jin alternatively played the supporting role of the bold and clever Layla in the play Dear Elena (2020). Written in 1980 by Ljudmila Razumovskaya, this work poignantly reveals the inner conflict of man.

In October and November, Kim reprised her role of Temple Grandin in the movement play Temple for Welcome Daehakro-Welcome Theater 2020. In December, Kim joined Dream Theater Company's representative repertoire play Touch Your Love, written and directed by Jung Hyung-seok. Premiering at Daehak-ro in the fall of 2013, it depicts the story of three characters, Dong-wook, Eun-ju, and Yoon-hee, who live with the wounds they have received because of love and people. In the 6th encore performance of the play, Kim Joo-yeon and Lee Seo-kyung were double-cast as female lead Eun-ju, who has a clear subjectivity and free-spirited personality.

2021 to present: screen roles and recent stage works 
From December to February 2021, Kim finally got to fully perform the role of Jin Se-hee in What's Your Macbeef? by playwright Shin So-won. Kim participated in its full-length reading performance of the play back on June 21, 2019, when the play was selected for the 2019 Juda Creative Contest. This play used play Richard McBeef written by Seung-Hui Cho, as its source material, making it a play within a play. Set in the theater class of an international high school located on the outskirts of the city, Jeong Dong-woo (theater teacher) and his three students, Jin Yoo, Lee Ji-soo, and Jin Se-hee prepare for the performance with recommendation from the homeroom teacher Yoon Young-jun. Directed by Kim Ji-ho, the official premiere of What's Your Macbeef? was held in Dream Art Center Hall 3, Seoul. Seo Hye-won and Yoo Yu-jin were triple-cast with Kim as Jin Se-hee.

In January 2021, the theater company Player Sang Sang, Steps announced that Kim was cast as Yun Shim-deok, the first soprano in Joseon, in the play Government Ferry (directed by Lee Ki-bum). The play is set on the Tokujumaru government ferry from Japan to Busan, and is a story that begins with the belief that Yun Shim-deok was alive. At an ambitious time when everyone is asleep, Hong Seok-ju, who is hiding in a boat, saves Yun Shim-deok, who jumps into the sea, and establishes a relationship. It is a story about understanding each other, sharing friendships, and drawing each other's hopes, although there are conflicts about how they lived different lives. The play was performed at the Jayu Theater in Daehangno, Seoul.

Kim's first television appearance was a minor role in the OCN drama series Watcher, back in 2019. In 2021, Kim had three credited television appearances, all as supporting roles, as Jin Ha-young in the drama Do Do Sol Sol La La Sol and a nurse in Youth of May, both broadcast on terrestrial TV network KBS2, followed by her cameo appearance as Han Geu-ra's mom in Netflix Original Series Move to Heaven. Her first major television role as supporting cast was in the healing drama Hometown Cha-Cha-Cha (2021). Kim acted as Ham Yung-kyung, a pregnant young mother who runs a mini-mart named after her daughter Bora. Kim starred opposite her Temple costar Yoon Seok-hyun who was cast as her husband, Choi Geum-chul. In the same year, Kim confirmed her appearance in her debut film Jochiwon Commentary (produced by Blue Cucumber, directed by Choi Yang-hyun). The film is inspired by the story of Hamlet, one of Shakespeare's four great tragedies. The adaptation incorporated Korean sentiment, and the local dialect of Chungcheong Province is added to maximize the tragedy.

Kim made a theater comeback as Emma in the musical Vampire Arthur (2021–2022). Set in 1930s London, it tells the story of a vampire named Arthur and Emma, an illiterate poor girl, and the growth and love between them. It was held at the Black Theater, Chungmu Art Center, Seoul from November 9, 2021, until February 6, 2022. Created by writer Seo Hwi-won and composer Kim De-ri, it premiered in front of an audience for the first time in 2017 through the story writer's debut program 'Black and Blue Season 4'. The showcase was held from March 23 to 24, 2018. The premiere was staged at the Black Theater, Chungmu Art Center, Seoul from November 30, 2018, to February 2, 2019, by director Kim Dong-yeon. In the recent Vampire Arthur (2021–2022) replay, writer Park Hae-rim and music director Choi Hee-young joined as a new creative team to act as a screenwriter and music director.

In March 2022, it was announced that in April 2022, Kim would be cast in the first work of The 9th Best Plays Festival, the play The Nature of Forgetting from British production Theater Re. When the work premiered in London in 2017 by director Guillaume Pigé and composer Alex Judd, it was praised as a movement full of the blessings of life. In Korea, in 2019, it was produced by the Wooran Foundation for the Performing Arts and The Best Play. It was successful in capturing the hearts of domestic audiences with all seats sold out. Kim performed dual roles as wife and daughter of the role played by actor Kim Ji-cheol, who took on the role of a man who loses his memory due to early dementia.

Kim's next works were two overlapping projects, the play Helmet and the creative musical Sylvia Lives. She was double-cast in the gender-blind role of Helmet B with Jeong In-jeong in the fourth performance of the play Helmet. The play is written by Ji Yi-sun, who wrote the plays Capone Trilogy and Bunker Trilogy. Directed by Kim Tae-hyung, it was performed between May 17, 2022, and August 11, 2022, at Hongik University Daehak-ro Art Center's Small Theater.

The creative musical Sylvia Lives is based on the story of the work, life, and meaning of death of Pulitzer Prize-winning genius poet Sylvia Plath (1932-1963). To understand Sylvia's character, Kim read The Diary of Sylvia Plath and her poems. It is a representative musical of Performance Studio Production, which is centered on writer and director Jo Yoon-ji and composer Kim Seung-min. After going through the Arko-Han Ye-jong Musical Academy in 2020 and the Yes24 Stage Showcase in 2021, it was premiered as a work selected by the Seoul Foundation for Arts and Culture in 2022. Music director Lee Han-mil and choreographer Choi Seong-dae served as the creative team. Kim Joo-yeon performed as Sylvia with Ju Da-on, and Choi Tae-yi who performed the role since its 2020 showcase. The musical Sylvia, Live was performed from July 12, 2022, to August 28, 2022, in Daehak-ro TOM 2 Building.

Kim Joo-yeon joined the musical L'art reste, as Byeon Dong-rim, which premiered in September 2022. It alternately told the story of Kim Hyang-an and her husband Kim Whan-ki, with flashbacks to her younger-self Byeon Dong-rim (Kim Hyang-an's real name) and her love affair with the poet Lee Sang. The play performed at Dream Art Center 2, Daehak-ro.

In November 2022, Kim back with two plays, Clumsy People and Orphans. The play Clumsy People, written and directed by Korea's representative storyteller Jang Jin, returned to the stage after 10 years. Clumsy People premiered in 1995 as an entry at the Seoul Theater Festival. It was the work that made Jang Jin a star on Daehak-ro. It had encore performances in 2007 and 2012. Kim Joo-yeon, Choi Ha-yoon, and Park Ji-ye participated in the role of Yoo Hwa-yi, who is talkative and remote, but full of cheerful and lively charm. It's a reunion project between Kim Joo-yeon and Jang Jin following Taxi Driver. In the play Orphans, in a gender-blind casting, Kim Joo-yeon, along with fellow actors Choi Soo-jin, Hyun Seok-jun, and Shin Joo-hyeop were cast for the role of Philip. The play Orphans is the representative work of American playwright Lyle Kessler, which premiered in Los Angeles in 1983. At its Korean premiere in 2017 and its encore in 2019, it was sold out due to constant favorable reviews and word of mouth from the audience. The play won in 2017 and 2019 the Stagetalk Audience Choice Awards (SACA).

Filmographies

Film

Television

Web series

Music video

Stage credits

Musical

Theater

Awards and nominations

Notes 
1.Best Play Festival or Theater Heated Battle (연극열전) is a biennale theater festival with the purpose of motivating and enriching the Korean theater industry. 
2. StageTalk Audience's Choice Awards (SACA) is theater and musical award festival that decides the winner based on pure votes from fans of the performance in the best play category.

References

External links 
 Kim Joo-Yeon at BigBoss Entertainment Official Website 
 
 
 Kim Joo-Yeon at Daum Encyclopedia  
 Kim Joo-Yeon at PlayDB  

Living people
1993 births
Anyang Arts High School alumni
Dongguk University alumni
South Korean film actresses
South Korean musical theatre actresses
South Korean stage actresses
South Korean television actresses
21st-century South Korean actresses